Lat. may stand for:

Latin
Latitude

See also 
 Lat (disambiguation)